Sugamoto (written: 菅本) is a Japanese surname. Notable people with the surname include:

, Japanese footballer
, better known as Gamma, Japanese professional wrestler

Japanese-language surnames